The 2000 NCAA Division II men's basketball tournament was the 44th annual single-elimination tournament to determine the national champion of men's NCAA Division II college basketball in the United States.

Officially culminating the 1999–2000 NCAA Division II men's basketball season, the tournament featured forty-eight teams from around the country.

The Elite Eight, national semifinals, and championship were again played at the Commonwealth Convention Center in Louisville, Kentucky.

In a rematch of the previous year's final, Metro State (33–4) defeated defending champions Kentucky Wesleyan, 97–79, to win their first Division II national championship. 

The Roadrunners were coached by Mike Dunlap. Metro State's DeMarcos Anzures was the Most Outstanding Player.

Regionals

South - Lakeland, Florida 
Location: Jenkins Field House Host: Florida Southern College

South Central - Joplin, Missouri 
Location: Leggett & Platt Athletic Center Host: Missouri Southern State University

Northeast - New Haven, Connecticut 
Location: James Moore Fieldhouse Host: Southern Connecticut State University

North Central - Denver, Colorado 
Location: Auraria Events Center Host: Metropolitan State University

East - Charleston, West Virginia 
Location: Eddie King Gymnasium Host: University of Charleston

Great Lakes - Owensboro, Kentucky 
Location: Sportscenter Host: Kentucky Wesleyan College

South Atlantic - Wingate, North Carolina 
Location: Cuddy Arena Host: Wingate University

West - Seattle, Washington 
Location: Royal Brougham Pavilion Host: Seattle Pacific University

Elite Eight - Louisville, Kentucky
Location: Commonwealth Convention Center Host: Bellarmine College

All-tournament team
 DeMarcos Anzures, Metro State (MOP)
 Kane Oakley, Metro State 
 John Bynum, Metro State 
 Lee Barlow, Metro State 
 Lorico Duncan, Kentucky Wesleyan

See also
 2000 NCAA Division II women's basketball tournament
 2000 NCAA Division I men's basketball tournament
 2000 NCAA Division III men's basketball tournament
 2000 NAIA Division I men's basketball tournament
 2000 NAIA Division II men's basketball tournament

References
 NCAA Division II men's basketball tournament Results
 2000 NCAA Division II men's basketball tournament jonfmorse.com

NCAA Division II men's basketball tournament
NCAA Division II basketball tournament
NCAA Division II basketball tournament